The 1900 Dartmouth football team was an American football team that represented Dartmouth College as an independent during the 1900 college football season. In its first and only season under head coach Frederick E. Jennings, the team compiled a 2–4–2 record and was outscored by a total of 68 to 38. Frank Lowe was the team captain. The team played its home games at Alumni Oval in Hanover, New Hampshire.

Schedule

References

Dartmouth
Dartmouth Big Green football seasons
Dartmouth football